Andrew Gibson Brown, CBE, QPM (b 11 April 1945) was HM Chief Inspector of Constabulary for Scotland from 2004 to 2007.

He was educated at Kelso High School. He began his career as a Police Cadet in 1961; and by 1998 was  Assistant Chief Constable (Crime) with the Lothian and Borders Police. He was Chief Constable of Grampian Police from 1998 to 2004.

Notes

People from Kelso, Scottish Borders
Scottish police officers
Chief Inspectors of Constabulary (Scotland)
Law enforcement in Scotland
1945 births
Living people
Commanders of the Order of the British Empire
Scottish recipients of the Queen's Police Medal
People educated at Kelso High School, Scotland
British Chief Constables
Officers in Scottish police forces